Osowaw Junction is a ghost town in Okeechobee County, Florida, United States located about 9 miles away from Yeehaw Junction. The current main road through the former community is US Route 441.

Overview 
In 1914 a train station was built here several miles north of Fort Drum in the Kissimmee Valley Extension line of the Florida East Coast Railroad. The town's name comes from the Seminole word for "bird". The town was a citrus town with tangerine and orange groves. The town had a stable growing population and by 1921 the town got a public school. The town vanished when the rail line was abandoned.

References

Ghost towns in Florida
Geography of Okeechobee County, Florida